Allan Graham (born 23 October 1937) was an English professional footballer who played as a full-back for Sunderland.

References

1937 births
People from the City of Sunderland
Footballers from Tyne and Wear
English footballers
Association football fullbacks
Silksworth Juniors F.C. players
Sunderland A.F.C. players
Darlington Town F.C. players
English Football League players
Living people